The Sixteen Arhats (Chinese: 十六羅漢, pinyin: Shíliù Luóhàn, Rōmaji: Jūroku Rakan; Tibetan: གནས་བརྟན་བཅུ་དྲུག, "Neten Chudrug") are a group of legendary Arhats in Buddhism. The grouping of sixteen Arhats was brought to China, and later to Tibet, from India. In China, an expanded group of Eighteen Arhats later became much more popular, but worship of the sixteen Arhats still continues to the present day in China, Japan and Tibet. In Japan sixteen Arhats are particularly popular in Zen Buddhism, where they are treated as examples of behaviour. In Tibet, the sixteen Arhats, also known as sixteen sthaviras ('elders') are the subject of a liturgical practice associated with the festival of the Buddha's birth, composed by the Kashmiri teacher Shakyahribhadra (1127-1225). They are also well represented in Tibetan art.

The sixteen Arhats are:

See also

Eighteen Arhats

Notes